Aïn Taya is a suburb of Algiers, Algeria. It is located in the administrative constituency of Dar El Beïda in the Governorate of Greater Algiers. Its postal code is 16019 and its municipal code is 1638. Prior to its being part of the Governorate of Greater Algiers, it was part of Boumerdès Province with postal code 35310. The current president of the People's Municipal Assembly'(mayor) is Abdelkader Rakkas (2017-2022). Aïn Taya has a budget of 46 million DZD.

Demographics
Aïn Taya had a population of 34,501 at the 2008 census (3,568/km2). An important part of the population is of Kabyle origin. Historical populations include:
78 families (1847)
1,666, of whom 549 were French (1870)
5,674, of whom 3,500 muslims 
6,100 (1954)
13,700 (1987 census)
29,515 (1998 census)

Geography
It also has 8 km (almost 5 mi) of coastline located a few kilometers east of the easternmost point of the gulf of Algiers, on the Mediterranean Sea.

Railway
In 1914, it was connected to Algiers by 1055 mm gauge local railway Chemins de Fer sur Routes d´Algerie. The trains departed from Algiers at 6.09, 13.29, and 17.40 arriving in Aïn-Taya at 8.21, 15.37 and 19.57. The return workings departed from Aïn-Taya at 5.37, 12.53 and 17.13 arriving in Algiers at 7.45, 15.05 and 19.25. The rail distance was 32 km (20 miles). This service was hauled by a Decauville built narrow gauge steam locomotives. The C.F.R.A. also operated also lines from Algiers to Rovigo and via Gyotville to Kolea (44 km) and Casiglione (47 km).

Former mayors
This is a list of Aïn Taya's mayors during French colonial times.
Joseph Guyot 1870-1878 
Jean Dabadie 1879-1884 
Casimir Fabre 1884-1891 
Paul Oudaille 1891-1895 
Désiré Dulin 1896-1898 
Joseph Chabert 1898-1904 
Paul Fabre 1904-1910 
Charles Pellegrin 1910-1919 
Michel Sinters 1920-1935 
Auguste Allier 1935-1945 
Emile Bertoni 1945-1948 
Hector Buchardt 1948-1949
? Gadrel 1949-1962

Notable people

References

Suburbs of Algiers
Communes of Algiers Province